Hindi Kita Malilimutan (I Won't Forget You) is a 1993 Filipino film written and directed by Jose Javier Reyes and stars Aga Muhlach and Carmina Villaroel. It tells the story of an unusual relationship between a brother and a sister. Rowena, an ambitious lass influenced by her peers is disgraced by her brother's illiteracy. A harmonious relationship is suddenly ruined.

Cast
 Aga Muhlach as Nestor
 Carmina Villaroel as Rowena
 Maricel Laxa as Jocelyn
 Jomari Yllana as Lando
 Chanda Romero as Cita
 Paulie Yllana as Toffy's mother
 Ramil Rodriguez as Congressman
 Gina Leviste as Congressman's wife
 Pocholo Montes as Peping
 Sunshine Cruz as Vicky
 Ericka Fife as Denise
 Ian Bernardo as Eric
 Charlie Davao as Anton
 Miguel Espinosa as Monchet
 Alan Paule as Frankie
 Mon Confiado as Simon

Awards and nominations

References

Philippine romantic drama films
1993 films